Qaseem Khan (born 1 February 1993) is an Afghan cricketer.  Khan is a right-handed batsman who fields as a wicket-keeper.

Khan made his Twenty20 debut for the Afghan Cheetahs in the Faysal Bank Twenty-20 Cup against Rawalpindi Rams.  He played in the Cheetahs two other fixtures in that competition, against Faisalabad Wolves and Multan Tigers. He made his first-class debut for Afghanistan against Zimbabwe A during Afghanistan's tour to Zimbabwe on 27 July 2014.

References

External links
 
 

1993 births
Living people
Afghan cricketers
Afghan Cheetahs cricketers
Place of birth missing (living people)
Asian Games medalists in cricket
Cricketers at the 2014 Asian Games
Asian Games silver medalists for Afghanistan
Medalists at the 2014 Asian Games
Wicket-keepers